Carroll Paul Huntress (January 4, 1924 – February 11, 2015) was an American football coach.  He served as the head football coach at Bucknell University from 1965 to 1968, compiling a record of 19–19.  Huntress was born on January 4, 1924, in Saco, Maine.  After serving in the United States Marine Corps during World War II, he played football and lacrosse the University of New Hampshire. Huntress began his coaching career in 1949 at Mechanic Falls High School in Mechanic Falls, Maine, where he coached football, basketball, and baseball.

Head coaching record

College

References

1924 births
2015 deaths
American football fullbacks
American football halfbacks
Bucknell Bison football coaches
Kentucky Wildcats football coaches
Maryland Terrapins football coaches
New Hampshire Wildcats football players
New York Jets coaches
High school baseball coaches in the United States
High school basketball coaches in Maine
High school football coaches in Maine
United States Marine Corps personnel of World War II
United States Marines
People from Saco, Maine
Players of American football from Maine